Vinberg Nature Reserve is a municipal nature reserve in Falkenberg Municipality, Halland County, Sweden, of area 14.02ha. It was established by the municipality in 2003 and managed by it. NUTS code: SE231.

The reserve is located just south of Vinberg locality. Vinån rivulet (tributary of Ätran) flows across the reserve.

References

Falkenberg Municipality
Nature reserves in Halland County
Protected areas established in 2003
2003 establishments in Sweden